"Inside Your Heaven" is a song written by Andreas Carlsson, Pelle Nylén, Savan Kotecha, and produced by Desmond Child. Carrie Underwood and Bo Bice, the final two contestants on the fourth season of American Idol, each released a version of the song in June 2005.

Underwood, the winner of Idol, released her version as a single on June 14, 2005. It debuted at number one on the US Billboard Hot 100 and on the Canadian Singles Chart, where it remained for one and seven weeks, respectively. The other A-side of the single is a cover of the Martina McBride song "Independence Day". Bice's version was released the following week, on June 21, and peaked at number two on the Billboard Hot 100 and Canadian Singles Chart. This version's A-side is a cover of the song "Vehicle" by the Ides of March.

The song gave Underwood the Billboard Music Awards for "Top-Selling Country Single of the Year" and "Top-Selling Hot 100 Song of the Year" (Bice's version was also nominated in this category). It also helped Underwood win the award for "Country Single Sales Artist of the Year". Underwood later included "Inside Your Heaven" on the North American edition of her debut studio album, Some Hearts (2005).

Critical reception
Chuck Taylor of Billboard magazine reviewed the two renditions of "Inside Your Heaven" on the June 18, 2005 issue. Calling the overall song "difficult" and "dauntingly shallow," he preferred Bo Bice's more meaningful version over Carrie Underwood's, saying of the latter, "'Inside Your Heaven' leaves [Underwood] little room but to shriek across so many octaves that even Celine Dion would leave this song in tatters". Reviewing Underwood's album Some Hearts on AllMusic, Stephen Thomas Erlewine labeled "Inside Your Heaven" as the worst song on the album, writing that the country pop formula used throughout the album does not work for this track, calling it "sappy and transparent" with a weak arrangement.

Commercial performance

Carrie Underwood version
Underwood's version of "Inside Your Heaven" was released on June 14, 2005. On July 2, 2005, the song debuted atop the US Billboard Hot 100 as the "Hot Shot Debut", interrupting the 14-week reign of Mariah Carey's "We Belong Together" for this issue alone. The following week, the song dropped to number three, and it spent a total of 12 weeks on the listing, making its final appearance at number 98 on September 17, 2005. "Inside Your Heaven" gave Underwood the distinction of becoming the first country musician to debut at number one and the only solo country artist to obtain a number-one single during the 2000s decade. "Inside Your Heaven" also debuted at number one on the Billboard Pop 100 chart, losing the position the following week to Bice's version. The track additionally appeared on the Billboard Adult Contemporary and Hot Country Songs charts, reaching number 12 and number 52, respectively. It was the 71st-best-selling hit and the 23rd-most-successful adult contemporary song of 2005 in the US.

In Canada, the song charted alongside "Independence Day", immediately topping the Canadian Singles Chart and staying there for seven weeks, until August 20, 2005. It spent 35 weeks on the listing. The RIAA awarded the song two Gold certifications: one for shipping over 500,000 physical units in July 2005 and one for selling over 500,000 digital copies in November 2005. Music Canada awarded the single a double-platinum certification, denoting shipments exceeding 20,000 units. As of June 2009, the song has sold 362,000 digital copies and 459,000 physical copies in the US alone.

Bo Bice version
Bice released his rendition of the song of June 21, 2005, a week after Underwood's. In effect, it first appeared on the Billboard Hot 100 the week after Underwood's version had done the same, at number two, on July 9, 2005, becoming that week's "Hot Shot Debut" as well. It quickly fell down the chart afterwards, remaining in the top 100 for seven issues and spending its last week at number 89 on August 20. On the Pop 100, "Inside Your Heaven" succeeded Underwood's version at the top spot on the July 9 issue.

The same day, on the Canadian Singles Chart, Bice's version entered at its peak of number two with "Vehicle". It spent six weeks at that position before losing its place on August 20, going on to log 29 weeks on the ranking. In July, it earned a gold certification from the RIAA for shipping over 500,000 physical copies in the US. Meanwhile, in Canada during the same month, it sold over 10,000 units, allowing it to receive a platinum disc from Music Canada. As of June 2009, Bice's version has shipped over 349,000 physical units and sold over 52,000 digital copies.

Aftermath
Following her win on American Idol, Underwood officially signed with Arista Records and embarked on the American Idols Live! Tour 2005 with the other top-10 finalists of the fourth season, including Bice. She has since become one of the competition's most successful alumni, selling more than 70 million records worldwide, earning numerous awards, and accruing a net worth of $200 million as of May 2020. Bice has since released three albums, founded his own record label, and fronted American band Blood, Sweat and Tears during their tours.

Awards

|-
! scope="row" rowspan="3" | 2005
| rowspan="3" | Billboard Music Awards
| Top-Selling Hot 100 Song of the Year
| rowspan="2" | Carrie Underwood
| 
| 
|-
| Top-Selling Country Single
| 
| 
|-
| Top-Selling Hot 100 Song of the Year
| Bo Bice
| 
|

Track listings

Carrie Underwood version
US CD single
 "Inside Your Heaven"
 "Independence Day"

US 7-inch single
A. "Inside Your Heaven" (radio version) – 3:26
B. "Independence Day" (radio version) – 3:24

Bo Bice version
US CD single
 "Inside Your Heaven"
 "Vehicle" 

US 7-inch single
A. "Inside Your Heaven" – 4:12
B. "Vehicle"  – 2:49

Credits and personnel
Credits are adapted from the liner notes of the CD singles. Both versions of the song were recorded at The Gentlemen's Club, Capitol Records, The Record Plant, and The Village (Los Angeles, California).

Both versions

 Andreas Carlsson – writer, background vocals
 Pelle Nylén – writing
 Savan Kotecha – piano, writing
 Desmond Child – production, background vocals
 Joe Yannece – drums, master
 Brian Coleman – production manager
 Simon Fuller – management
 19 Management – management
 Michael Segal – photography
 Harry Sommerdahl – keyboards, programming, arrangement, recording
 Eric Bazilian – guitar, madolin
 John Pierce – bass

 Abe Laboriel Jr. – drums
 Kim Bullard – organ, strings
 Storm Lee – vocals
 Jules Gondar – recording
 Steve Churchyard – recording
 Matt Gruber – recording
 Suren Wijeyaratne – assistant engineer
 Jimmy Hoyson – assistant engineer
 Mike Eleopoulos – assistant engineer
 Noel Zancanella – assistant engineer
 Carrie Underwood – background vocals
 Jules Gondar – recording

Carrie Underwood version

 Carrie Underwood – lead vocals
 Serban Ghenea – mixing
 Tim Roberts – drums, assistant mix engineer
 John Hanes – piano, additional protools engineer
 Jeanette Olsson – background vocals
 Gretchen Peters – strings, writer
 Randy Cantor – guitar, bass, lap steel guitar, keyboards, programming, recording

 Jacob Miller – additional vocal production
 Carlos Alvarez – mixing
 Bryan Golder – recording
 Mikal Blue – recording
 Stephen Crook – recording
 Clarita Sanchaz – assistant mix engineer

Bo Bice version

 Bo Bice – lead vocals, background vocals
 Kevin Mills – piano, assistant mix engineer
 Greg Collins – mixing
 John Shanks – background vocals
 Jim Peterik – bass guitar, writer
 Corky James – strings
 Andy Ackland – bass guitar, recording
 Glenn Pittman – assistant engineer

 Mike Houge – lead guitar, assistant engineer
 Ray Herrmann – saxophone
 Nick Lane – trombone arrangement, horn arrangement
 Rafael Padilla – percussion
 Victor Indrizzo – drums
 Richie Sambora – background vocals, guitar
 Paul Bushnell – background vocals
 Jeff Steele – bass

Charts

Weekly charts

Carrie Underwood version

Bo Bice version

Year-end charts

Carrie Underwood version

Certifications

Carrie Underwood version

Bo Bice version

Release history

See also
 List of Hot 100 number-one singles of 2005 (U.S.)
 List of Pop 100 number-one singles (U.S.)
 List of Canadian number-one singles of 2005

References

2005 debut singles
2005 songs
American Idol songs
Arista Records singles
Bertelsmann Music Group singles
Billboard Hot 100 number-one singles
Bo Bice songs
Canadian Singles Chart number-one singles
Carrie Underwood songs
Pop ballads
RCA Records singles
Songs written by Andreas Carlsson
Songs written by Savan Kotecha
Syco Music singles